Beatty Point is a  elevation summit located in the Kolob Canyons area of Zion National Park in Washington County, Utah, United States.

Description
Paria Point is situated  immediately north, and Nagunt Mesa is  immediately south, with 2,000-foot-deep finger canyons between each. Other neighbors include Timber Top Mountain to the south-southwest, and Tucupit Point to the north. Beatty Point is composed of Jurassic Navajo sandstone overlaying tilted Kayenta Formation. Precipitation runoff  drains into Timber Creek and Taylor Creek, which are both part of the Virgin River drainage basin. This geographical feature's name honors the Beatty family of Toquerville, Utah. Walter Lamb Beatty served as a guide for 20 years in Zion National Park.

Climate
Spring and fall are the most favorable seasons to visit Beatty Point. According to the Köppen climate classification system, it is located in a Cold semi-arid climate zone, which is defined by the coldest month having an average mean temperature below 32 °F (0 °C), and at least 50% of the total annual precipitation being received during the spring and summer.

See also

 List of mountains in Utah
 Geology of the Zion and Kolob canyons area
 Colorado Plateau

References

External links

 Zion National Park National Park Service
 Weather forecast: Beatty Point
 Beatty Point rock climbing: Mountainproject.com
 Walter Lamb Beatty: Findagrave.com

Mountains of Utah
Zion National Park
Mountains of Washington County, Utah
Rock formations of Utah
Sandstone formations of the United States
Landforms of Washington County, Utah
North American 2000 m summits